is a Japanese carbonated soft drink manufactured by the Cheerio Corporation. The drink comes in multiple flavors, and was introduced in 1963. The drinks used to be sold in glass bottles, similar to those used for Ramune. In recent years, with the proliferation of steel and aluminum cans and PET bottles, Cheerio (grape and orange only) in glass bottles is only available in the Chūbu region southwest of Tokyo, as well as three vending units in Kanagawa Prefecture.

Flavors
Apple
Grape
Melon
Orange
Fruit punch
Organic black tea
Organic green tea

References

External links 
 Cheerio's official corporate website

Japanese drinks
Fruit sodas
Products introduced in 1963